Bob Frazer (born 1971) is a Canadian actor of stage and television.

Frazer was born in Ontario. He lives in British Columbia.

Career
Frazer has won multiple Jessie Richardson Theatre Awards, including: "Outstanding Performance by an Actor in a Leading Role" (2005–2006) for his role in Hamlet, "Outstanding Performance by an Actor in a Supporting Role" (2005–2006) for his role in Prodigal Son, and won for "Significant Artistic Achievement" (2003–2004). He has also been a nominee over ten times including "Outstanding Performance by an Actor in a Supporting Role" (2003–2004) for The Glass Menagerie; Iago in Shakespeare's Othello; and as Antipholus of Ephesus in Comedy of Errors during the 2009 season of Bard on the Beach.

Filmography
 The Angel of Pennsylvania Avenue (TV – 1996) as Deputy Sheriff
 Taken (TV Mini-Series – 2005) as Captain Bishop
 Zacharia Farted (1998) as Kevin Wishart
 Bob the Butler (2005) as Coach Jerry
 Girlfriend Experience (2008) as John (voice)
 Interrogation (2016) as Federal Officer
 Finding Mr. Right 2 (2016) as Thomas' Lawyer
 The Cannon (2017) as Colton
 1922 (2017) as Andrew Lester
 Drinkwater (2021) as Wesley Ryan
 Fire Country (2022) as Samuel SR

References

Sources

External links

1971 births
Living people
Canadian male film actors
Canadian male television actors
Canadian male voice actors
Canadian male stage actors
Male actors from British Columbia
Male actors from Ontario
Studio 58 people